The black-throated honeyeater (Caligavis subfrenata) is a species of bird in the family Meliphagidae. It is found in New Guinea. Its natural habitat is subtropical or tropical moist montane forest.

The black-throated honeyeater was originally described in 1876 as Lichenostomus subfrenatus, but was moved to Caligavis after a molecular phylogenetic analysis published in 2011 showed that Lichenostomus was polyphyletic.

References

black-throated honeyeater
Birds of New Guinea
black-throated honeyeater
Taxonomy articles created by Polbot
Endemic fauna of New Guinea